Central heating may refer to:
Central heating, a heating system that distributes heat from a single source
Central Heating (Grand Central album), the second compilation released by Grand Central Records
Central Heating 2, the fourth compilation from Grand Central Records
Central Heating (Heatwave album), 1978, or the title song

See also
Central Heating Plant, (Washington, D.C.), listed on the National Register of Historic Places